John Dougall may refer to:
John Dougall (actor), British actor
John Dougall (mathematician) (1867–1960), Scottish mathematician
John Dougall (merchant) (1808–1886), Scottish-born Canadian merchant
John Dougall (Utah politician) (born 1966), American politician
John Joseph Dougall (1860–1934), mayor of Christchurch, New Zealand